The following is a list of notable television and film personalities who made guest appearances on the Fox crime drama 21 Jump Street.

Season 1

Season 2

Season 3

Season 4

Season 5

 Mario Van Peebles also directed these episodes.

See also
Jump Street

References

Guest stars
Lists of actors by American television series
Lists of American television series characters
21
21 Jump Street